Lilliconus biraghii is a species of sea snail, a marine gastropod mollusk, in the family Conidae, the cone snails and their allies.

Subspecies
 Lilliconus biraghii biraghii (G. Raybaudi Massilia, 1992)
 Lilliconus biraghii congruens Korn & G. Raybaudi Massilia, 1993
 Lilliconus biraghii omanensis (Moolenbeek & Coomans, 1993)

Description
The size of the shell varies between 9 mm and 17 mm.

Distribution
This species occurs in the Indian Ocean off Somalia.

References

 Tucker J.K. & Tenorio M.J. (2009) Systematic classification of Recent and fossil conoidean gastropods. Hackenheim: Conchbooks. 296 pp
  Puillandre N., Duda T.F., Meyer C., Olivera B.M. & Bouchet P. (2015). One, four or 100 genera? A new classification of the cone snails. Journal of Molluscan Studies. 81: 1-23.

External links
 The Conus Biodiversity website
 See image at Gastropods.com Lilliconus biraghii biraghii

Endemic fauna of Somalia
biraghii
Gastropods described in 1992